Persebi stands for Persatuan Sepakbola Bima (en: Football Association of Bima). Persebi Bima is an  Indonesian football club based in Bima, Sumbawa, West Nusa Tenggara. They play in Liga 3.

They main rival is Persekobi Bima City, a club based in Bima City. The derby often called Bima Derby.

Honours
 Liga 3 West Nusa Tenggara
 Champion: 2019

References

External links
Liga-Indonesia.co.id

Football clubs in Indonesia
Football clubs in West Nusa Tenggara
Association football clubs established in 1964
1964 establishments in Indonesia